Shadow of a Doubt is a 1943 American psychological thriller film directed by Alfred Hitchcock, and starring Teresa Wright and Joseph Cotten. Written by Thornton Wilder, Sally Benson, and Alma Reville, the film was nominated for an Academy Award for Best Story for Gordon McDonell. 

Charlotte "Charlie" Newton lives with her parents in Santa Rosa, when charming and sophisticated Charles "Uncle Charlie" Oakley comes to visit at short notice. Charlie slowly realizes Oakley is in fact a wanted man, the "Merry Widow" killer, something Oakley soon recognizes.

In 1991, the film was selected for preservation in the United States National Film Registry by the Library of Congress, being deemed "culturally, historically, or aesthetically significant". The film was also Alfred Hitchcock's favorite of all of his films.

Plot
Charlotte "Charlie" Newton is a bored teenage girl living in the idyllic town of Santa Rosa, California. She receives wonderful news: Her mother's younger brother (her eponym), Charles Oakley, is arriving for a visit. Her uncle arrives, and at first, everyone is delighted with his visit, especially young Charlie. Uncle Charlie gives his niece an emerald ring that has someone else's initials engraved inside. 

Two men appear at the Newton home, trying to take Uncle Charlie's picture. Young Charlie guesses they are undercover police detectives. One of them explains her uncle is one of two suspects who may be the "Merry Widow Murderer". Charlie refuses to believe it at first but then observes Uncle Charlie acting strangely. The initials engraved inside the ring he gave her match those of one of the murdered women, and during a family dinner, he reveals his hatred of rich widows.

One night Uncle Charlie lets his guard down and describes elderly widows as "fat, wheezing animals"; horrified, Charlie runs out. Uncle Charlie follows and takes her into a seedy bar. He admits he is one of the two suspects. He begs her for help; she reluctantly agrees not to say anything, as long as he leaves soon to avoid a horrible confrontation that would destroy her mother, who idolizes her younger brother. 

News breaks that an alternative suspect was chased by police and killed by an airplane propeller; it is assumed that he was the murderer. Uncle Charlie is delighted to be exonerated, but young Charlie knows all his secrets. Soon, she falls down dangerously steep stairs, which she later notices were cut through. Uncle Charlie says he wants to settle down, and young Charlie says she will kill him if he stays. Later that night, Uncle Charlie lures young Charlie into the garage, jamming the door and filling the garage with exhaust fumes. A friend comes by and hears Charlie banging on the garage door and gets her out in time.

Uncle Charlie announces he is leaving for San Francisco, along with a rich widow, Mrs. Potter. At the train station, young Charlie boards the train claiming to want to see Uncle Charlie's compartment. Uncle Charlie hopes to kill her by shoving her out after it picks up speed. However, in the ensuing struggle, he falls in front of an oncoming train. At his funeral, Uncle Charlie is honored by the townspeople. The detective returns, and Charlie confesses that she withheld crucial information. They resolve to keep Uncle Charlie's crimes a secret.

Cast

 Teresa Wright as Charlotte "Charlie" Newton, a precocious teenager who initially idolizes her loving uncle.
 Joseph Cotten as Charles "Uncle Charlie" Oakley
 Macdonald Carey as Detective Jack Graham
 Henry Travers as Joseph Newton, Young Charlie's father, who loves to read crime stories.
 Patricia Collinge as Emma Newton, Young Charlie's mother and Uncle Charlie's sister.
 Wallace Ford as Detective Fred Saunders
 Hume Cronyn as Herbie Hawkins, a neighbor and crime fiction buff. He discusses ideas for the perfect murder with Charlie's father.
 Edna May Wonacott as Ann Newton
 Charles Bates as Roger Newton
 Irving Bacon as Station Master
 Clarence Muse as Pullman Porter
 Janet Shaw as Louise Finch
 Estelle Jewell as Catherine

Uncredited cast
 Alfred Hitchcock as Man playing cards on train
 Minerva Urecal as Mrs. Henderson
 Isabel Randolph as Mrs. Margaret Green
 Earle S. Dewey as Mr. Norton
 Eily Malyon as Librarian
 Edward Fielding as Doctor on Train
 Vaughan Glaser as Dr. Phillips
 Virginia Brissac as Mrs. Phillips
 Sarah Edwards as Wife of Doctor on Train
 Ruth Lee as Mrs. MacCurdy
 Grandon Rhoades as Reverend MacCurdy
 Edwin Stanley as Mr. Green
 Frances Carson as Mrs. Potter
 Byron Shores as Detective
 John McGuire as Detective
 Constance Purdy as Mrs. Martin
 Shirley Mills as Young girl

Hitchcock's cameo
Alfred Hitchcock appears about 16 minutes into the film, on the train to Santa Rosa, playing bridge with Doctor and Mrs. Harry. Charlie is traveling on the train under the assumed name of Otis, and is lying down due to a migraine. Mrs. Harry is eager to help him, but her husband is not interested and keeps playing bridge. Doctor Harry replies to Hitchcock that he doesn't look well while Hitchcock is holding a full suit of spades, the best hand for bridge.

Production
The project began when the head of David Selznick's story department, Margaret McDonell, told Hitchcock that her husband Gordon had an interesting idea for a novel that she thought would make a good movie. His idea, called "Uncle Charlie", was based on the true story of Earle Nelson, a serial killer of the late 1920s known as "the Gorilla Man".

Shadow of a Doubt was both filmed and set in Santa Rosa, California, which was portrayed as a paragon of a supposedly peaceful, small, pre-War American city. Since Thornton Wilder wrote the original script, the story is set in a small American town, a popular setting of Wilder's, but with an added Hitchcock touch to it. In Patrick McGilligan's biography of Hitchcock, he said the film was perhaps the most American film that Hitchcock had made up to that time.

The opening scenes take place in the East Ward (aka the "Ironbound"/"Down Neck" section of Newark, New Jersey). The city skyline and landmarks such as the Pulaski Skyway are featured in the opening shot. The location shots were used to comply with the wartime War Production Board restrictions of a maximum cost of $5,000 for set construction.

The Newton family home is located at 904 McDonald Avenue in Santa Rosa, which is still standing. The stone railway station in the film was built in 1904 for the Northwestern Pacific Railroad and is one of the few commercial buildings in central Santa Rosa to survive the earthquake of April 18, 1906. The station is currently a visitor center. The library was a Carnegie Library which was demolished in 1964 due to seismic concerns. Some of the buildings in the center of Santa Rosa that are seen in the film were damaged or destroyed by earthquakes in 1969; much of the area was cleared of debris and largely rebuilt.

The film was scored by Dimitri Tiomkin, his first collaboration with Hitchcock (the others being Strangers on a Train, I Confess and Dial M for Murder). In his score, Tiomkin quotes the Merry Widow Waltz of Franz Lehár, often in somewhat distorted forms, as a leitmotif for Uncle Charlie and his serial murders. During the opening credits, the waltz theme is heard along with a prolonged shot of couples dancing.

Reception

Upon release, the film received unanimously positive reviews. Bosley Crowther, critic for The New York Times, loved the film, stating that "Hitchcock could raise more goose pimples to the square inch of a customer's flesh than any other director in Hollywood". Time Magazine called the film "superb", while Variety stated that "Hitchcock deftly etches his small-town characters and homey surroundings". The entertainment trade paper The Film Daily was yet another reviewer in 1943 that praised every aspect of the production. The publication predicted big “box office” for theaters presenting Hitchcock's latest work, although in its detailed review of Shadow of a Doubt the paper does mistakenly refer to the director's 1941 film Suspicion as "'Suspense'":

In a 1964 interview on Telescope with host Fletcher Markle, Markle noted, "Mr. Hitchcock, most critics have always considered Shadow of a Doubt, which you made in 1943, as your finest film." Hitchcock replied immediately, "Me too." Markle then asked, "That is your opinion of it still?" Hitchcock replied, "Oh, no question." At the time, Hitchcock's most recent work was Marnie. When later interviewed by François Truffaut, Hitchcock denied the suggestion that Shadow of a Doubt was his "favourite". But in the audio interview with Truffaut, Hitchcock confirmed it was his favourite film, and later reiterated that Shadow of a Doubt was his favorite film in his interview with Mike Douglas in 1969 and in his interview with Dick Cavett in 1972. Alfred Hitchcock's daughter Pat Hitchcock also said that her father's favorite film was Shadow of a Doubt in Laurent Bouzereau’s 2000 documentary Beyond Doubt: The Making of Hitchcock's Favorite Film.

Today, the film is still regarded as a major work of Hitchcock's. Contemporary critic Dave Kehr called it Hitchcock's "first indisputable masterpiece." In 2005 film critic David Denby of The New Yorker called it Hitchcock's most "intimate and heart-wrenching" film. Based on 48 reviews on the website Rotten Tomatoes, the film has received a 100% approval rating, with a weighted average of 9.20/10. The site's consensus reads: "Alfred Hitchcock's earliest classic — and his own personal favorite — deals its flesh-crawling thrills as deftly as its finely shaded characters". On Metacritic it has a score of 94 out of 100, based on reviews from 15 critics, indicating "universal acclaim". When asked by critics as to an overarching theme for the film Hitchcock responded: "Love and good order is no defense against evil". In his book Bambi vs. Godzilla, David Mamet calls it Hitchcock's finest film. In his 2011 review of the film, film critic Roger Ebert gave the film four stars out of four and included it in his Great Movies list. In 2022, Time Out magazine ranked the film at No. 41 on their list of "The 100 best thriller films of all time".

Adaptations and remakes

Radio
The film was adapted for Cecil B. DeMille's Lux Radio Theater aired on January 3, 1944 with its original leading actress Teresa Wright and William Powell as Uncle Charlie (Patrick McGilligan said Hitchcock had originally wanted Powell to play Uncle Charlie, but MGM refused to lend the actor for the film). In 1950, Shadow of a Doubt was featured as a radio-play on Screen Directors Playhouse. It starred Cary Grant as Uncle Charlie and Betsy Drake as the young Charlie. It was also adapted to the Ford Theater (February 18, 1949). The Screen Guild Theater adapted the film twice with Joseph Cotten, the first with Vanessa Brown as young Charlie, and the second with Deanna Durbin in the role. The Academy Award Theater production of Shadow of a Doubt was aired on September 11, 1946.

Film
The film has been remade twice: in 1958 as Step Down to Terror, and again (under the original title) as a 1991 TV movie in which Mark Harmon portrayed Uncle Charlie.

Shadow of a Doubt influenced the beginning of Park Chan-wook's 2013 film Stoker.

See also
 List of films with a 100% rating on Rotten Tomatoes, a film review aggregator website

References

External links

Shadow of a Doubt essay  by Thomas Leitch at National Film Registry
 
 
 
 
 
 
 Shadow of a Doubt essay by Daniel Eagan in America's Film Legacy: The Authoritative Guide to the Landmark Movies in the National Film Registry, A&C Black, 2010 , pages 360-361 

Streaming audio
 Shadow of a Doubt on Screen Guild Theater: May 24, 1943
 Shadow of a Doubt on Lux Radio Theater: January 3, 1944

1943 films
1940s psychological thriller films
1940s serial killer films
American black-and-white films
American psychological thriller films
American serial killer films
1940s English-language films
Films scored by Dimitri Tiomkin
Films directed by Alfred Hitchcock
Films set in California
Films set in the San Francisco Bay Area
Films shot in California
Films shot in Newark, New Jersey
United States National Film Registry films
Universal Pictures films
1940s American films